Bjølsegrøvvatnet is a lake in the municipality of Kvam in Vestland county, Norway. It has a dam on the southeastern tip of the lake to regulate the amount of water in it. The lake is used as a reservoir for the nearby Bjølvo hydroelectric power station.

See also
List of lakes in Norway

References

Lakes of Vestland
Kvam
Reservoirs in Norway